Daddy Day Care is a 2003 American family comedy film starring Eddie Murphy in the lead role, Jeff Garlin, Steve Zahn, Regina King, and Anjelica Huston. Written by Geoff Rodkey and directed by Steve Carr, it marks Murphy and Carr's second collaboration after Dr. Dolittle 2 (2001). The plot follows two fathers who start a child day care out of their home after they are laid off from their corporate jobs.

The film was released in the United States on May 9, 2003, by Columbia Pictures. It received generally negative reviews from critics, and grossed $164 million worldwide on a budget of $60 million. The movie was followed by two sequels, in the film series of the same name.

Plot
Charlie Hinton is a market executive at a local food company. Charlie and his wife Kim had just enrolled their son, Ben into Chapman Academy, an over academic preschool held by the haughty Gwyneth Harridan. However, on the day they enrolled him, Charlie and his best friend, Phil Ryerson, find themselves (along with 300 others) fired when their boss, CEO Jim Fields, shuts down the company's entire health division due to children disliking new, healthy breakfast cereals made from vegetables. Charlie then breaks the news to Kim and Ben at dinner who tell him to get a new job. 

While Kim supports the family by returning to work as a lawyer, Charlie, after six weeks of job hunting, is forced by the bank to take Ben out of Chapman. Unable to find a satisfactory alternative (one place was in a trailer park with a sickly woman, one had a place with keeping the kids in the basement, and the last place was surrounded by police), Charlie opens a daycare center in his home with the help of Phil, calling it "Daddy Day Care". Although local parents are suspicious of men working with kids, a few choose their service as it's more affordable and child-based.

Charlie and Phil open with a few children, struggling at first with chaos, and some personal issues. Angered at the competition, Harridan attempts to shut them down, notifying child services of the new daycare. Charlie and Phil find themselves rectifying problems pointed out by Dan Kubitz, a director of child services, to ensure their daycare is suitable for children, including hiring their former colleague Marvin as an additional care provider by following the rules by adding a third care provider to the kids they have.

In time, they slowly begin to enjoy running Daddy Day Care, which grows in popularity, and bonding with the kids, with Charlie delighted to see Ben enjoying himself, and having a good time. Harridan continues trying to shut them down after losing children to them. When Kubitz points out the house cannot accommodate the number of children they have, he suggests that they remove two kids (because the maximum is 12 and they had 14) or find a permanent facility somewhere in town. Charlie is reclutant to remove two of the kids and instead wants to buy a building in town to keep the daycare center opening.

Marvin quickly mentions he knows of a building with potential, but they cannot afford to buy the building. They decide to hold a fundraising children's festival called "Rock for Daddy Day Care", to raise the necessary capital. However, Harridan learns of the event and sabotages it with help from her hesitant assistant Jennifer (who never does anything bad) by deflating the bounce house, releasing the animals from the petting zoo, replacing the face paint with glue (in which the paintbrush stuck to Marvin's cheek while trying to show a kid who doesn't like face painting), putting cockroaches in the food, letting the goats eat the pies, and bribing the groundskeeper of the park to let the sprinklers run for two hours, soaking everyone and making everyone leave the festival. As a result, Charlie and Phil do not have the money to pay for the building. 

At the same time, Jim offers Charlie and Phil their old jobs back at double their salaries, letting them run the whole health division. They have decided to rehire him as an earlier idea of his said flippantly for cotton candy cereal is a big hit and they want him to market it. Harridan offers to take in their children for a more affordable price in exchange for Daddy Day Care shutting down. Charlie and Phil reluctantly accept the offer, leaving Marvin heartbroken and refusing to join them. Ben is also upset when Charlie tells him he has to go back to Chapman tomorrow. The next day, at the marketing meeting, Charlie questions his decision, after he realizes the impact Daddy Day Care has had on Ben and the other children. He then declares that his kid, Ben, is the most important thing to him, and quits.

Convincing Phil to quit with him and re-open Daddy Day Care, and informing Marvin of their plans, Charlie confronts Harridan during a student orientation and reveals to the parents in attendance how little she cares about their children. After mentioning how much Daddy Day Care changed and helped the children, Charlie convinces the parents to go back to Daddy Day Care, forcing Chapman to go out of business for good. Six months later, the daycare manages to buy the building it needs to expand, and prospers, with Charlie and Phil now successful, Jennifer now working for the center, and Marvin entering a relationship with one of the children's mothers. With Chapman no more, Harridan is forced to work as a crossing guard in disgrace.

Cast

Cheap Trick appear as themselves at the Rock for Daddy Day Care charity event.

Production
Shooting began on August 1, 2002 in Los Angeles, California.

The film's poster was officially released in December of that year, with the tagline, D-Day is coming.

Release

Critical reception
On Rotten Tomatoes, Daddy Day Care has an approval rating of 27% based on 132 reviews, with an average rating of 4.51/10. The website's critical consensus reads, "Daddy Day Care does its job of babysitting the tots. Anyone older will probably be bored". On Metacritic, the film has a weighted average score of 39 out of 100, based on 31 critics, indicating "generally unfavorable reviews". Audiences polled by CinemaScore gave the film an average grade of "A−" on an A+ to F scale.

Todd McCarthy from Variety called it "scarcely more amusing than spending ninety minutes in a pre K classroom" and a "comically undernourished junk food snack".

Box office
Despite the negative critical ratings, the film was a box office success, grossing over $160 million worldwide based on a $60 million budget. The film was released in the United Kingdom on July 11, 2003, and opened at #3, behind Charlie's Angels: Full Throttle and Bruce Almighty. The next two weekends, the film moved down one place, before finally ending up at No. 10 on August 1.

Sequels

Soon after the release of Daddy Day Care, Murphy was rumored to be involved in a sequel film, although he had not signed up for one. A sequel was released on August 8, 2007, titled Daddy Day Camp, with Cuba Gooding, Jr. replacing Murphy as Charlie Hinton and Sony once again distributes the film (this time under TriStar). The film was panned by critics, with a 1% rating on Rotten Tomatoes. It won the Razzie Award for "Worst Prequel or Sequel". Another sequel, Grand-Daddy Day Care, was released on February 5, 2019 by Universal Pictures Home Entertainment on direct-to-video format. Da'Vone McDonald portrayed Charlie Hinton, who appears as a supporting character.

References

External links

 
 
 
 

2003 films
2003 comedy films
American buddy comedy films
Marvin the Martian films
Films set in Los Angeles
Films shot in California
Films directed by Steve Carr
Columbia Pictures films
Revolution Studios films
Davis Entertainment films
Films scored by David Newman
Films produced by John Davis
American children's comedy films
Films produced by Wyck Godfrey
Films about parenting
2000s buddy comedy films
2000s English-language films
2000s American films